The following is a list of the 75 schools who field men's lacrosse teams and the 127 schools who field women's lacrosse teams in NCAA Division I competition, plus one school that has announced plans to begin fielding its Division I men's lacrosse team in 2024 and three schools that have planned to begin fielding Division I women's lacrosse teams in 2025.

Conference affiliations are current for the forthcoming 2023 NCAA lacrosse season.

Future conference moves noted in this page reflect lacrosse seasons, which take place in the calendar year after a conference change takes effect.

Men

Future men's teams

Women

Future women's teams

Footnotes

See also 
 NCAA Division I Men's Lacrosse Championship
 NCAA Division I Men's Lacrosse Championship all-time team records
 NCAA Division I Men's Lacrosse Championship appearances by school
 NCAA Division I Women's Lacrosse Championship
 College lacrosse
 List of NCAA Division II lacrosse programs
 NAIA lacrosse

References

Lacrosse

NCAA Division I
NCAA lacrosse
 
Lacrosse, Division I